SCDP may refer to:

South Carolina Democratic Party, in the United States
Soviet Committee for the Defense of Peace, a state-sponsored organization in the Soviet Union
Sterling Cooper Draper Pryce, a fictional company from the television series Mad Men

See also
Open Smart Card Development Platform (OpenSCDP)
Sammarinese Christian Democratic Party (PDCS, from its Italian name )
SCD prototile, a space-filling polyhedron
South Carolina Department of Public Safety (SCDPS)